Clone Drone in the Danger Zone is a beat 'em up video game developed and published by Doborog Games. It was initially made available as an early access game on Steam in 2017, and was released for macOS and Microsoft Windows via Steam, Nintendo Switch, PlayStation 4, and Xbox One on July 27, 2021.

In the game, the player's mind has been transferred into a robot gladiator. Playing as a robot, the player must fight against "floors" of enemies by using weapons or the environment around them. The playable area is built like a Colosseum, with similar robot NPCs in the stands of the arena. After each level, the player can upgrade themselves or gain new abilities such as clones, new weapons, or lower cooldowns. The game has 4 modes: story mode, endless mode, challenges, and Twitch mode.

History 
The game started as an early access game released on Steam on March 16, 2017. Doborog Games was founded by the game's creator, Erik Rydeman at the same time. In May 29, 2020, it was announced via the game's blog that it would be released worldwide in 2021.

On May 5, 2017, a level editor was released, and custom levels could be uploaded to the Steam Workshop.

On November 15, 2019, achievements, emotes, skins, and multiplayer were added.

On June 1, 2021, Doborog announced on Steam that the game would be released on all platforms on July 27, 2021.

Plot 
Robots are trying to conquer Earth and have enslaved large parts of humanity. Instead of forcing labor and work, the minds of people are transferred into robotic bodies. Using these robots, the emperor pits them against other fighting robots for their own entertainment, similar to a Colosseum fight.

Chapter one 
If the player makes it to level 10, they will be spoken to by a floating head, later revealed to be the first human to escape the colosseum, helps the player to escape via the garbage shoot.

Chapter two 
Chapter two takes place right after the first, with a new human. Similar to the last, if the player makes it to level 10 they will escape. This time via a garbage bot picking the player up and flying them to a hidden room within the fictional city. In the room is the robot the player previously escaped with in chapter one, waiting for them. It is also revealed in this chapter that the robots are going to invade earth.

Chapter three 
Once again, Chapter three takes place right after the last, Emilia, the floating head, talks to the players and informs them of their goal; to stop the robots from invading earth. To do this, however, the player must make their way through a tower that can transfer the player(s) to a ship making it's way to earth. Once the player makes it to the top of the tower, they must beat a "fleet overseer" a spider-like boss with various different weapons. Once defeated the player may try to transfer to the ship but gets stopped by the emperor who proceeds to kill one of the allied robots and Emilia, however, the player still makes (with only one robot) it to a ship within the fleet.

Chapter Four 
As the player is transferred into a mark 1 sword robot aboard one of the ships, they get whisked away into a "storage room", by the ship's commander. Once in said room the player gets killed by a spear bot and gains control of the spear robot with a "mind transfer virus" installed by Emilia before she died. Using this virus the player eventually makes their way through the ship and must take control of the ship. To do this the player must defeat the captain, who is the same as the fleet overseer from chapter three, and control bots, mind, infantry, logistics, and warfare, each with their own weapons and attack styles. Once all of said enemies are defeated, the player may take control of the ship.

Gameplay 
The player assumes the role of a gladiator robot. The main goal is to kill all of the enemies on each floor before progressing. In between levels, the player can upgrade their abilities via an upgrade station in the form of a robotic welder, known as an upgrade bot. Throughout gameplay, two robot commentators randomly discuss various moves and events in monotonous tones. Some levels include hazards like lava or spike traps.

Story mode 
Story mode consists of 5 chapters with 3 different difficulties. The difficulties consist of normal, hard, and insane, each having harder stages and enemies than the last.

Endless mode 
In endless mode, the goal is to aim for a highscore of how many floors have been completed. The floors are initially pre-made, but later become procedurally generated as the game continues. Each floor has the same surrounding layout, with the center floor changing each level. The game's arena is built similar to a Colosseum, with fans in the stands to the side and a throne on the back wall. Each "set" of floors is ranked by a name indicating its difficulty. This rating ranges from "bronze" to "insanium".

Challenge mode 
The player must defeat an enemy or group of enemies under a specific criteria. There are in total, twelve challenges for the player to take on.

Challenges include 
 Hammer only challenge
 Unlocks fire hammer
 Bow only challenge
 Unlocks fire arrows
 Spear only challenge
 Unlocks fire spear
 Kick only challenge
 Unlocks power kick
 Inferno challenge
 Unlocks fire breath
 Laser challenge
 unlocks a nice trophy
 Raptor/Raptor insanity challenges
 Unlocks nice trophies
 Random upgrade challenge
 Unlocks a nice trophy
 Armor challenge
 Unlocks a nice trophy
 Greatsword challenge
 Unlocks a nice trophy
Mind transfer challenge
Unlocks a nice trophy

Twitch mode 
Using Twitch integrations, viewers can join and compete against the player, vote to spawn in enemies, or bet on which floor the player will die. Those who won the bet are able to summon more difficult enemies.

Reception 
Beta versions of Clone Drone in the Danger Zone received favorable reviews. Critics praised its voxel style and simple gameplay, and often commented on the game's difficulty in the endless mode.

Steam gave Clone Drone in the Danger Zone a 10/10.

Kotaku reviewer Heather Alexandra said that "Each victory feels satisfying. Each failure feels brutal.", also commenting that "Clone Drone In The Danger Zone is the video game version of Skittles. Bright and refreshing junk food that serious hits the spot when you need it."

Robert Purchese of Eurogamer praised the game's comedy and simple gameplay, saying "It's all very Monty Python and it's absolutely supposed to be. Clone Drone in the Danger Zone is a comedy.", and "The combat here isn't as complex. It's been reduced to a few moves: left and right swipes, and an overhead strike."

Notes

References 

Beat 'em ups
Early access video games
2021 video games
Nintendo Switch games
Xbox One games
PlayStation 4 games
MacOS games
Video games about cloning
Video games about gladiatorial combat
Shoot 'em ups